A slippery sequence is a small section of codon nucleotide sequences (usually UUUAAAC) that controls the rate and chance of ribosomal frameshifting. A slippery sequence causes a faster ribosomal transfer which in turn can cause the reading ribosome to "slip." This allows a tRNA to shift by 1 base (−1) after it has paired with its anticodon, changing the reading frame. A −1 frameshift triggered by such a sequence is a Programmed −1 Ribosomal Frameshift. It is followed by a spacer region, and an RNA secondary structure. Such sequences are common in virus polyproteins.

The frameshift occurs due to wobble pairing. The Gibbs free energy of secondary structures downstream give a hint at how often frameshift happens. Tension on the mRNA molecule also plays a role. A list of slippery sequences found in animal viruses is available from Huang et al.

Slippery sequences that cause a 2-base slip (−2 frameshift) have been constructed out of the HIV UUUUUUA sequence.

See also 
Nucleic acid tertiary structure
Open reading frame
Ribosomal frameshifting
Translational frameshift
Transposable element

References

External links 
 Pseudobase
 Recode
 
 Wise2 - aligns a protein against a DNA sequence allowing frameshifts and introns
 FastY - compare a DNA sequence to a protein sequence database, allowing gaps and frameshifts
 Path - tool that compares two frameshift proteins (back-translation principle)
 Recode2 - Database of recoded genes, including those that require programmed Translational frameshift.

RNA
Gene expression
Cis-regulatory RNA elements
Coronaviridae